The Indian Citation Index (ICI) is an online bibliographic database containing abstracts and citations from academic journals. Currently ICI covers more than 1100 journals from India covering scientific, technical, medical, and social sciences that includes arts and humanities. ICI covers data from 2004 onwards and provides full text of the title for Open Access journals. At present there are more than 300 OA journals. ICI provides search and analytical features. ICI was launched in India in 2009 and is funded by Diva Enterprises Pvt. Ltd.

Overview
The ICI was launched in Oct 2009 New Delhi, with 100 journals. It provides access to full text for all Open Access journals. It links to Google Scholar for additional information and provides analytical tools.

There are 50 different top level subject categories like Health Science, Mathematics, Computer Science & Technology, Economics, and Agriculture. These subject categories are further sub-divided into second and third levels.

Coverage
The database is constantly updated, nearly two/three journals are added every month, target is to add 100 journals.

Details about ICI database
  1100+ Science, technical, medical, and social sciences (including arts and humanities)
  300+ Open Access journals, ICI provides full text for these journals
  Coverage from 2004 to present day
  600+ thousand source titles (index articles)
  13.3+ million references

See also
 Energy Science and Technology Database
 ETDEWEB
 Geographic Names Information System
 Global Health database
 Materials Science Citation Index
 List of academic journal search engines
 List of academic databases and search engines

References

External links

Bibliographic databases and indexes
Online databases
Science and technology in India
Citation indices